Identity is the seventh Japanese studio album (thirteenth overall) by South Korean singer BoA. It was released on February 10, 2010, nearly two years since The Face.

Promotion
The album was preceded in release by the singles "Bump Bump!," a collaboration with Verbal from the hip-hop group M-flo, and "Mamoritai: White Wishes." The singles peaked at No. 5 and No. 2 on the Oricon charts, respectively. Also, there was an official music video for "Possibility". However, it was not released as a single.

Chart performance
Identity debuted at No. 2 on the daily Oricon albums chart with 14,023 units sold in its first day and at No. 4 on the weekly chart with 37,606 copies sold making it her first Japanese album that did not chart to number 1, ending her streak of studio albums debuting at No. 1 on the Oricon weekly charts.  "Identity" also became BoA's first studio album to not reach over 100,000 units sold and not receive certification.

Track listing

Charts and sales

Release history

References

External links

2010 albums
BoA albums
Avex Group albums